Sphenophorus abbreviatus is a true weevil species in the genus Sphenophorus.

References

External links 

 Curculio elegans at eunis.eea.europa.eu

Dryophthorinae
Beetles described in 1787
Beetles of Europe